East Kangaloon is a locality in the Southern Highlands of New South Wales, Australia, in Wingecarribee Shire. 

According to the 2021 census, there were 80 people living at East Kangaloon.

References 

Towns of the Southern Highlands (New South Wales)